The 58th Street station was the penultimate station on the demolished section of the BMT Fifth Avenue Line in Brooklyn, New York City. It was served by trains of the BMT Fifth Avenue Line, and had two tracks and one island platform. The station was built on October 1, 1893. The next stop to the north was 52nd Street. The next stop to the south was the 65th Street Terminal. It closed on May 31, 1940. Current rapid transit service in this area can be found one block east and then another block south at the 59th Street station on the underground BMT Fourth Avenue Line and BMT Sea Beach Line.

References

BMT Fifth Avenue Line stations
Railway stations in the United States opened in 1893
Railway stations closed in 1940
Former elevated and subway stations in Brooklyn
Sunset Park, Brooklyn